Garrick Morgan (born 25 January 1970), is an Australian former rugby footballer, who played rugby union for the Australian team from 1992 to 1997.

In 2006, he became coach of the Gold Coast Breakers.

Career

Club
 Downlands College (High School)
 South Queensland Crushers (rugby league) 1995
 Queensland Reds 1996-1998
 Harlequins 1998-2002 (captain)
 Section Paloise 2002-2006

Rugby league career
In 1995 Morgan signed a three-year, $600,000 contract to play rugby league for the South Queensland Crushers. His father, John Morgan had played for Sydney club Manly-Warringah from 1963 to 1970 and had also represented New South Wales on five occasions in interstate matches against Queensland.

Morgan made just two appearances for the Crushers before signing for the Queensland Reds at the end of the season and returning to rugby union.

With the Wallabies
 Garrick Morgan played his first test match on 4 July 1992 against the New Zealand team (won 16–15) and his last test match on 26 July 1997 against the New Zealand team (lost 18–33 in Melbourne)

Garrick Morgan was yellow carded in match in 1992 against Munster while playing for Australia in Ireland.

Honours

Club
 Winner of European Challenge Cup in 2000–2001.
 Finalist in European Challenge Cup 2004–2005.

With the Wallabies
 24 caps
 3 tries (15 points)
 Caps by year : 3 in 1992, 8 in 1993, 5 in 1994, 6 in 1996, 2 in 1997.

References

External links 
statistics at scrum.com
statistics at itsrugby.com
 

1970 births
Australian rugby union players
Australian rugby league players
South Queensland Crushers players
Living people
Australia international rugby union players
Harlequin F.C. players
Queensland Reds players
Rugby league players from Sydney
Rugby union locks
Rugby union players from Sydney